Ronquières is a village of Wallonia and a district of the municipality of Braine-le-Comte, located in the province of Hainaut, Belgium.

It is best known as the location of the Ronquières inclined plane on the Brussels-Charleroi Canal. The lower end of the inclined plane is just a few hundred metres from the centre of the village.

The population of the village was 1370 as of January 2006.

References

External links
 
 Ronquières - The inclined plane boat lift

Former municipalities of Hainaut (province)